Tha Wang Phrao, also known as Ban Tha Wang Phrao (1)and Ban Tha Wāng Phrāu, is a tambon (subdistrict) of San Pa Tong District, in Chiang Mai Province, Thailand. In 2005 it had a population of 3697 people. The tambon contains seven villages. Nearby village is Ban Ruean.

Popular Place 
 The Chiang Mai Night Safari 
 Chiang Mai University 
 Wat Chedi Luang
 Doi Suthep–Pui National Park
 Doi Suthep, is a mountain
 Wat Phra Singh
 Bhubing Palace

References

Tambon of Chiang Mai province
Populated places in Chiang Mai province